The 15th edition of the annual Holland Ladies Tour was held from September 4 to September 9, 2012. The women's stage race with an UCI rating of 2.2 started in Neerijnen, and ended in Berg en Terblijt.

The Holland Ladies Tour 2012 had financial problems due to sponsoring problems. Their sponsor quit and it was unsure if the Tour would be organized in 2012. The organization initially decided to organize the tour without a new sponsor, before signing a sponsorship contract with Dutch hairdressing salon chain BrainWash and renaming the 15th edition of the race the BrainWash Ladies Tour.

Stages

2012-09-04 Neerijnen — Neerijnen (108.2 km)

2012-09-05 Dronten — Dronten (Team Time Trial) (33.8 km)

2012-09-06 Leerdam — Leerdam (122.2 km)

2012-09-07 Zaltbommel — Zaltbommel (122.4 km)

2012-09-08 Bergeijk — Bergeijk (126.7 km)

2012-09-09 Bunde — Berg en Terblijt (87.9 km)

Final standings

General Classification

Best Young Rider Classification

Combination Classification

References

2012
Holland Ladies Tour
Holland Ladies Tour
Cycling in Utrecht (province)
Cycling in Bergeijk
Cycling in Dronten
Cycling in Meerssen
Cycling in Valkenburg aan de Geul
Cycling in West Betuwe
Cycling in Zaltbommel
Sport in Vijfheerenlanden